Siple Dome is an ice dome approximately 100 km wide and 100 km long, located 130 km east of Siple Coast in Antarctica. Charles Bentley and Robert Thomas established a "strain rosette" on this feature to determine ice movement in 1973–74. They referred to the feature as Siple Dome because of its proximity to Siple Coast.

Siple Dome ice core
The Siple Dome ice core project (79.468° S 112.086° W) was conducted by the United States National Science Foundation. The deepest ice was recovered in 1999 from 974 m, with an age of 97,600 years.

It is best known for the poorly-explained steps in water isotopes during the deglacial, which are unique to this core and may indicate a rapid decrease in the surface elevation of the adjoining ice streams during the deglacial and a record of atmospheric carbon dioxide.
The Chief Scientist was Kendrick Taylor.

Radar surveys of internal ice structure 

In the 1990s a team from the University of Washington and St Olaf College surveyed the ice, measuring thickness and determining internal structure, 
finding evidence for the operation of the Raymond Effect. They also found that the ice had a maximum thickness of around 1000 m.

In popular culture 
 A documentary on climate change research associated with the Siple Dome ice core was produced by Nova: Warnings from the Ice, 1998. The documentary explains how reductions in Antarctic ice mass can raise sea level.
 Siple Dome is referenced in the song "Fall of Sipledome" by thrash metal band Testament (on their 1999 album The Gathering).

Climate
The climate is ice cap (Köppen: ET), as is most of the continent. Without marine moderation and a few hundred meters above sea level, it has one of the harshest winters on the continent outside the Antarctic plateaus. Unlike Alert, NU at slightly higher latitude and positive high averages during summer, in Siple Dome temperatures remain below freezing during the afternoon of the warmer months on average.

See also 

 WAIS Divide
 List of Antarctic field camps
 Airports in Antarctica

Further reading 
 Jinho Ahn, Edward J. Brook, Siple Dome ice reveals two modes of millennial CO2 change during the last ice age 
 Pavel G. Talalay, Mechanical Ice Drilling Technology, PP 201– 202

References

Ice caps of Antarctica
Bodies of ice of Marie Byrd Land